Ivan Rebroff  (31 July 193127 February 2008) was a German-born vocalist, allegedly of Russian ancestry, who rose to prominence for his distinct and extensive vocal range of four and a half octaves, ranging from the soprano to bass registers.

Life and career
Rebroff was born in Berlin as Hans-Rolf Rippert to German parents.  His parents were Paul Rippert, an engineer born in 1897 in Liebenwerda, and Luise Fenske, born in Bydgoszcz (then part of Prussian Bromberg).  He claimed Russian descent, and while often disputed, this has never been totally refuted. In a 1989 interview with Izvestia, he said "according to documents I am Ivan Pavlovich Rebroff".

He studied singing at the Hochschule für Musik und Theater Hamburg. Although his knowledge and pronunciation of Russian was imperfect, he became famous for singing Russian folk songs, but also performed opera, light classics and folk songs from many other countries. He was known on stage for his gusto. He performed over 6,000 concerts in his career, including a two-year seven-day-a-week stint at the French opera, singing and acting, among other greats, the role of Tevye in Fiddler on the Roof. Rebroff still performed 12 shows in 14 days when he was well into his seventies, such as on an Australian tour.

Ivan Rebroff described himself as international, the "connection between East and West". He became a citizen of Greece and lived on the Greek island of Skopelos in the Sporades. Rebroff was homosexual.

As well as being a phenomenal singer, videos such as this and photos such as this suggest that he was at least a reasonable violinist and keyboardist (he is pictured playing a church organ but may have also played the piano).

He died in Frankfurt after a long illness. Four days after his death, his brother Horst Rippert, who is nine years his senior (and by his own unsubstantiated accounts shot down Antoine de Saint Exupéry during World War II), claimed part of Rebroff's vast fortune.

LP discography

1967 
Folk Songs from Old Russia (Volksweisen aus dem alten Russland)

1968 
Folk Songs from Old Russia Volume II (Volksweisen aus dem alten Russland 2)
Original russische Liebeslieder
Na Sdarowje (Ivan sings about Vodka and Wine)
Slawische Seele (Compilation album shared with Tatjana Ivanow & Dunja Rajter)

1969 
Beim Klang der Balalaika, Au son des Balalaikas (French version of Beim Klang der Balalaika)
Favourites from Mother Russia
Abendglocken (Compilation)
Russische Weihnacht mit Ivan Rebroff
Ivan Rebroff (Includes Lara's Theme and other Popular Melodies)
A Russian Christmas (English version of Russische Weihnacht?)
Un Violon sur le toit (Soundtrack of French production of Fiddler on the Roof)
Russische Party ("Live" album)
Festliche Weihnacht (with Regensburger Domspatzen - Boys' Choir)
A Festive Christmas (Festliche Weihnacht re-issue)

1970 
Somewhere My Love (English-language versions)
Kosaken müssen reiten (German-language versions)
Ivan Rebroff (Compilation?)

1971 
The Best of Ivan Rebroff  (Compilation)
Ivan Rebroff Sing vir Ons (South African Album-Gold Disk Award)
Vir Jou Suid-Afrika (South African album)
Ivan Rebroff (Opera)
Kalinka (Soundtrack from L'Homme qui vient de la Nuit)
Mein Russland, Du bist schön (German-language versions)
Starportrait (Compilation)
Zwischen Donau und Don (with Dunja Rajter)

1972 
Erinnerungen an Russland (Russian-language versions)
The Best of Ivan Rebroff Volume II (Compilation)

1973 
Lieder der Welt (Folk songs from around the world)
Mein Altes Russland (lushly arranged Russian folk songs)
25 Greatest Russian Melodies (Compilation with Tatiana Ivanov (2 duets))
20 Greatest Hits (Compilation)

1974 
Russische Party 2 ("Live" album)
Memories of Russia

1975 
Ivan Rebroff at Carnegie Hall (Live at Carnegie Hall)
Reich Mir Die Hand
Russische Lieder Von Liebe und Tod

1977 
Midnight in Moscow (Russian-language versions)
Komm mit nach Hellas (German-language versions of Greek songs)

1978 
Mitternacht in Moskau (German version of Midnight in Moscow)

1979 
Ave Maria
Die Ivan Rebroff Versameling (Compilation of South African tracks)

1980 
Zauber einer großen Stimme — 20 unvergängliche Welterfolge
Zauber einer großen Stimme — Seine größten Welterfolge
Die schönsten Lieder dieser Welt (Ivan Rebroff singt 20 unvergängliche Melodien)
Katharina und Potemkin (TV musical/operetta)

CD discography

1976 
 Die Fledermaus conducted by Carlos Kleiber - Deutsche Grammophon - with Hermann Prey, Julia Varady, Lucia Popp, Rene Kollo, Bernd Weikl, Benno Kusche, and Eva List - Bayerischer Staatsopernchor & Bayerisches Staatsorchester 2002 Meine Reise um die WeltThe Great Ivan RebroffAch Natascha"

2003 
Seine Größten Welterfolge
Best of Ivan Rebroff
Golden Stars

Compilation albums 
Festliche Weihnachten
The Art of Ivan Rebroff
The Best of Russian Folk Songs Vol. 1
The Best of Russian Folk Songs Vol. 2
Erinnerungen an das letzte Jahrhundert (Memories of the Last Century)
Der Zarewitsch
Die Fledermaus (As Prince Orlofsky, with Carlos Kleiber & Bavarian State Orchestra)
Weihnachten mit Ivan Rebroff
Die schönste Stimme Rußlands
Kosakenträume

Notes

External links 
 
Ivan Rebroff Fan Page
Ivan Rebroff in Skopelos island

1931 births
2008 deaths
20th-century German male singers
Musicians from Berlin
People from Spandau
Recipients of the Cross of the Order of Merit of the Federal Republic of Germany
German people of Russian descent
German basses
Singers with a four-octave vocal range
Hochschule für Musik und Theater Hamburg alumni
Naturalized citizens of Greece
German folk singers
Columbia Records artists
German expatriates in Greece
Gay singers
German LGBT singers
German gay musicians
Skopelos
20th-century LGBT people
21st-century LGBT people